Luiz Antônio de Oliveira or simply Luizinho (born November 5, 1982 in Divinópolis), is a Brazilian right back.

Career

Honours
Campeonato Mineiro Módulo II: 2002
Minas Gerais Cup: 2004
Campeonato Mineiro: 2005, 2006
Taça Guanabara: 2007, 2008
Campeonato Carioca: 2007, 2008

Statistics
(Correct  November 30, 2008)

according to combined sources on the Flamengo official website and Flaestatística.

References

External links
 CBF
 sambafoot
 Guardian Stats Centre
 soccerterminal
 flamengorj
 globoesporte

1982 births
Living people
Brazilian footballers
Brazilian expatriate footballers
Villa Nova Atlético Clube players
Ipatinga Futebol Clube players
C.D. Nacional players
Cruzeiro Esporte Clube players
Santa Cruz Futebol Clube players
CR Flamengo footballers
Santos FC players
Brasiliense Futebol Clube players
Expatriate footballers in Portugal
Association football defenders